Annaba Rabah Bitat Airport , formerly known as Les Salines Airport, and popularly as El Mellah Airport is an international airport located  south of Annaba, a city in Algeria. It is named after Rabah Bitat, a president of Algeria (1978-1979).

History
Built at the time of French Algeria, the airport was named Bône-les-Salines, in reference to the salt lakes in the vicinity of the site.

It was put into operation in 1939 and a decree of December 16, 1958 entrusted the operation to the Chamber of Commerce of Bône.

World war II 
During World War II the airport was known as Bone Airfield, and was used by the German Luftwaffe.  Later captured by the United States Army, the USAAF Twelfth Air Force in the Western Desert Campaign in 1942–1943.

In November 1942 the Allies invaded French Morocco and Algeria (Operation Torch). The British airborne operations in North Africa started on 12 November, when the 3rd Battalion, Parachute Regiment carried out the first battalion sized parachute drop, on Bone airfield. The remainder of the 1st Parachute Brigade arrived by sea the next day. Bone Airfield was the base of No. 111 Squadron RAF, a Supermarine Spitfire squadron under Squadron Leader Tony Bartley. One notable pilot to fly from Bone on occasion was Wing Commander Adrian Warburton who was an infrequent visitor after crash landing there on 15 November 1942. 81 Squadron were based at Bone from 16 November to 31 January 1942 with 'Ras' Berry DSO DFC and then Colin F Gray DSO DFC being Squadron Leaders. Alan M Peart DFC also claimed his first aerial combat victory as well as two further aircraft damaged over Bone harbour during this time.

Algerian war 
After the war, the air base 213 one of the air bases of the French Air Force, was established on the site at that time. It was home to the 1/91 Gascogne Bombardment Group, a unit recreated on September 1, 1956 (and temporarily dissolved on September 17, 1962, after the Algerian War), which was equipped with Douglas B-26 Invaders.

Post-war period 
After Algerian independence, and until 2000, Annaba airport was named El-Mellaha (meaning in Arabic "Les Salines").

Since then, the airport has been named in honor of Rabah Bitat, former head of the Algerian state.

Facilities
The Old terminal had an annual capacity of 500,000 passengers. In January 2016, the new international terminal had been opened. The New Terminal, which commissioning generates 300 jobs, has an expandable capacity of 700,000 passengers per year.

Airlines and destinations

Statistics
The evolution of air traffic at Annaba airport between 2006 and 2020 is :

References

External links 

 Google Maps - Annaba Rabah Bitat

Airports in Algeria
Buildings and structures in Annaba Province